Garba (Gujarati: ગરબા) is a form of Gujarati dance which originates from the state of Gujarat in India. The name is derived from the  Sanskrit term Garbha . Many traditional garbas are performed around a centrally lit lamp or a picture or statue of the Goddess Shakti. Traditionally, it is performed during the nine-day Indian festival Navarātrī (Gujarati: નવરાત્રી, where નવ means 9, and રાત્રી means nights). Either the lamp (the Garba Deep) or an image of the Goddess, Durga (also called Amba) is placed in middle of concentric rings as an object of veneration.

Etymology
The word garba comes from the Sanskrit word for womb and so implies gestation or pregnancy — life.  Traditionally, the dance is performed around a clay lantern with a light inside, called a Garbha Deep ("womb lamp"). This lantern represents life, and the fetus in the womb in particular. The dancers thus honor Durga, the feminine form of divinity.

Garba is performed in a circle as a symbol of the Hindu view of time.  The rings of dancers revolve in cycles, as time in Hinduism is cyclical.  As the cycle of time revolves, from birth, to life, to death and again to rebirth, the only thing that is constant is the Goddess, that one unmoving symbol in the midst of all of this unending and infinite movement. The dance symbolizes that God, represented in feminine form in this case, is the only thing that remains unchanging in a constantly changing universe (jagat).

The Garbha Deep has another symbolic interpretation. The vessel itself is a symbol of the body, within whom Divinity (in the form of the Goddess) resides. Garba is danced around this symbol to honor the fact that all humans have the Divine energy of Devi within them.

Dance

Modern Garba is also heavily influenced by Dandiya Raas (Gujarātī: ડાંડીયા રાસ), a dance traditionally performed by men. The merger of these two dances has formed the high-energy dance that is seen today.

Both men and women usually wear colorful clothes while performing garba and dandiya. The girls and the women wear Chaniya choli, a three-piece dress with a choli, which is an embroidered and colorful blouse, teamed with chaniya, which is the flared, skirt-like bottom, with intricate work and dupatta, which is usually worn in the traditional Gujarati manner. Chaniya Cholis are decorated with beads, shells, mirrors, stars, and embroidery work, mati, etc. Traditionally, women adorn themselves with jhumkas (large earrings), necklaces, bindi, bajubandh, chudas and kangans, kamarbandh, payal, and mojiris. Boys and men wear kafni pyjamas with a Ghagra - a short round kurta - above the knees and pagadi on the head with bandhini dupatta, kada, and mojiris. In Gujarati, these clothes worn by men is called 'Kediyu'. Over the years, the interest in Garba has only increased. There is a huge interest in Garba among the youth of India and in particular, the Gujarati diaspora. Traditionally, this dance is performed in concentric circles and the entire group performs once step in sync, with the beat starting slow and slowly catching on speed.

Garba and Dandiya Raas are also popular in the United States where more than 20 universities have Raas/Garba competitions on a huge scale every year with professional choreography. The Canadian city of Toronto now hosts North America's largest annual garba by number of attendees. Garba is also very popular in the United Kingdom where there are a number of Gujarati communities who hold their own Garba nights and widely popular among the Gujarati community worldwide.

Tradition
Garba is a Gujarati folk dance celebrated in Navratri, a celebration lasting nine nights. Garba songs typically revolve around the subjects of the nine goddesses.  Garba styles vary from place to place in Gujarat.

The traditional clothing of the Garba dancer is red, pink, yellow, orange, and brightly colored chanya, choli or ghagra choli; dupatta with bandhani (tie-dye), abhla (big mirrors) or with thick Gujarati borders. They also wear heavy jewellery, such as 2-3 necklaces, sparkling bangles, waist belts, and long oxidized earrings. Traditionally men wear an ethnic kedia and a pajama or a dhoti with an oxidized bracelet and necklace. Normally, the dandiya sticks are Wooden.

References

Dances of India
Gujarati culture